Mountain fig is a common name for several plants and may refer to:

 Mountain fig, a wild growing variety of the common fig, Ficus carica
 Ficus glumosa, of the Afrotropics